Danny DiLiberto (born in Buffalo, New York) is an American retired professional pool player, nicknamed "Buffalo Danny".

A veteran player from the Johnston City era, a teacher, an author, and previously working as a commentator for Accu-Stats, DiLiberto is an active member of the pocket billiards community.  He was elected into the One Pocket Hall of Fame in 2004 for his "outstanding contribution to the legacy of  the game of one pocket".

Early boxing days

Before DiLiberto became interested in pocket billiards, he was a professional boxer from 1957-1959 with a 14-0-1 record, with 12 knockouts, until he was forced into retirement after breaking his hands four times. Muhammad Ali's trainer Angelo Dundee remarked that “Danny was a heck of a fighter”, “Whoever I put in front of him he knocked out. If it weren’t for his brittle hands he would have been a champion."
In 2006, he was inducted into Buffalo's Boxing Hall of Fame for his accomplishments in the sport.

Professional career 

The 1981 BCA National Eight-Ball Championship was a memorable victory for DiLiberto when he faced Nick Varner in the finals. Running out the deciding match was most appropriate for DiLiberto in what was until then a neck-and-neck race to 7 for the win.

DiLiberto was a member of the International Pool Tour.

A book was written by pool journalist Jerry Forsyth about Danny DiLiberto entitled "Road Player, the Danny DiLiberto Story".

On October 20, 2011, DiLiberto was inducted into the Billiard Congress of America's Hall of Fame. The ceremony took place alongside the 36th annual US Open 9-Ball Championships.

DiLiberto had won tournaments in four different divisions of professional pocket billiards: straight pool, one pocket, 8 ball, and 9 ball.

From 1989 to 2020 DiLiberto was a commentator for Accu-Stats Video Productions.

Career titles & achievements
 1961 New York City 14.1 Championship
 1962 New York State 14.1 Championship
 1965 Florida State 14.1 Championship
 1968 Florida State 14.1 Championship
 1969 U.S. Masters Straight Pool Championship
 1972 Ohio State 14.1 Championship
 1972 Johnston City Straight Pool Championship
 1972 Johnston City All-Around Championship
 1981 BCA National 8-Ball Tournament
 1982 Busch Open 9-Ball 
 1983 Florida Open 9-Ball
 1983 Florida One Pocket Championship	
 1984 Classic Cup IV 9-Ball
 1985 Austin One Pocket Championship
 1985 Eastern States Open 14.1
 1989 Western States Open 9-Ball
 1996 Senior Tour Nine Ball Tournament
 1997 French National Nine Ball Tournament 
 1998 French National Nine Ball Tournament
 2004 One Pocket Hall of Fame
 2006 Buffalo Boxing Hall of Fame
 2011 Billiard Congress of America Hall of Fame
 2017 Buffalo Sports Hall of Fame

References

American pool players
Living people
Sportspeople from Buffalo, New York
1935 births